These are some of the articles related to Burundi on the English Wikipedia:

Thierry Charlier, "L'armee burundaise aujourd'hui", RAIDS magazine No 317, October 2012,
pp 28 a 30. No ISSN 0769-4814.

0-9

A

Abahuza
Africa
Agathon Rwasa
Albertine Rift
Alphonse-Marie Kadege
African Great Lakes
Arusha Accord
Assassination of Habyarimana and Ntaryamira

B
Bantu
Belgian colonial empire
Bisoro
Bubanza
Bubanza Province
Bujumbura
Bujumbura Mairie Province
Bujumbura Rural
Burundi
Burundian monarchy
Burundi Civil War
Burundi franc
Burundi Workers' Party
Bururi
Bururi Province
Nicholas Bwakira

C

Cankuzo
Cankuzo Province
Chapter VII of the United Nations Charter
Charles Nqakula
Cibitoke Province
Collines of Burundi
Common Market for Eastern and Southern Africa
Commune of Gihanga
Commune of Mpanda
Commune of Musigati
Communes of Burundi
Cyprien Ntaryamira

D

Democratic Republic of the Congo
Domitien Ndayizeye

E
East Africa
East African Community
East African Federation
Economy of Burundi
Esther Kamatari

F
Front for Democracy in Burundi (FRODEBU)

G

Gatumba
Geography of Burundi
German East Africa
German East African rupie
Gihanga
Gitega
Gitega Province

H

Hamitic hypothesis
History of Burundi
Hutu
Hutu Power

I

International Crisis Group

J
Jean-Baptiste Bagaza
Jean Minani

K

Karuzi
Karuzi Province
Kasumo
Kirundo
Kingdom of Burundi
Kirundi
Kirundo Province
Kayanza
Kayanza Province

L

Lake Tanganyika
LGBT rights in Burundi (Gay rights)
List of kings of Burundi
List of political parties in Burundi

M

Makamba
Makamba Province
Melchior Ndadaye
Michel Micombero
Meeussen's rule
Mount Heha
Mugongo-Manga
Mpanda
Muramvya
Muramvya Province
Musigati
Mutaga IV Mbikije of Burundi
Muyinga
Muyinga Province
Mwambutsa I Mbariza
Mwambutsa IV Bangiriceng of Burundi
Mwami Mutaga III Senyamwiza Mutamo
Mwaro
Mwaro Province
Mwezi III Ndagushimiye of Burundi
Mwezi IV Gisabo of Burundi

N

National Council for the Defense of Democracy–Forces for the Defense of Democracy (NCDD-FDD)
National Forces of Liberation (PALIPEHUTU)
National Liberation Front (Burundi) (FROLINA)
Ntare I Kivimira Savuyimba Semunganzashamba Rushatsi Cambarantama
Ntare IV Rutaganzwa Rugamba
Ntare V of Burundi
Ngozi
Ngozi Province
Egide Nzojibwami
Vénuste Niyongabo

O
Origins of Tutsi and Hutu

P

Pierre Buyoya
Prince Godefroid Kamatari
Provinces of Burundi
Princess Esther Kamatari

Q

R
Radio Cordac
Ruanda-Urundi
Rurubu River
Rutana
Rutana Province
Ruyigi
Ruyigi Province
Rwanda

S
Senate of Burundi
Sylvestre Ntibantunganya

T

Tanzania
Titanic Express massacre
Tutsi
Twa

U
Union for National Progress
United Nations

V

W

X

Y

Z

Burundi